Ishikawa may refer to:

Concepts
Ishikawa diagram, cause-and-effect diagram, developed by Kaoru Ishikawa

Places
Ishikawa Prefecture, a prefecture in the Chūbu region on Honshū island, Japan
Ishikawa District, Ishikawa, a former district in Ishikawa Prefecture, Japan
Ishikawa District, Fukushima, a district in Fukushima Prefecture, Japan
Ishikawa, Fukushima, town in Ishikawa District, Fukushima Prefecture
Ishikawa, Okinawa, a city in Okinawa Prefecture, Japan
Ishikawa (restaurant), a Michelin 3-star sushi restaurant in Shinjuku, Tokyo Japan

People
Ishikawa (surname)
Ishikawa clan, a Japanese clan mainly active during the Sengoku Period